The Philippine Squash Academy (PSA) is the governing body of squash in the Philippines.

The PSA's predecessor is the Squash Rackets Association of the Philippines (SRAP) which was established in 1975. The SRAP was a regular member of Philippine Olympic Committee, Asian Squash Federation, and the World Squash Federation (WSF).

With consent from the WSF and POC, the PSA was named as the national sports association for squash in 2016 due to pending accountabilities related to SRAP.

References

External links
PSA Official site

Philippines
Squash
Squash in the Philippines
1975 establishments in the Philippines
Sports organizations established in 1975